Titanic is the sixth studio album by Australian musician Mark Seymour.

It was the second in the Liberation Blue series of acoustic versions, following Daytime and the Dark in 2005.

The album received a favorable review in the Sydney Morning Herald.

Track listing
(Words by Mark Seymour, music by Hunters & Collectors except where indicated)

 "Say Goodbye"  – 3:40
 "True Believers" – 4:04
 "The One & Only You" – 3:27
 "Back in the Hole" – 3:37
 "Blind Eye" – 3:32
 "She's Not Fooling Around"  – 3:59
 "Titanic" – 3:54
 "Everything's on Fire" – 3:37
 "Long Way to the Water" – 4:33
 "Talking to a Stranger" - 3:06
 "Hear No Evil" – 3:26
 "When You Fall" – 3:32
 "Dog" – 3:16
 "Parting Glass" (Traditional) – 3:55

Personnel
 Mark Seymour - guitars, vocals
 Cameron McKenzie - guitars, percussion
 Jake Mason - keyboards

References

2007 albums
Mark Seymour albums